In re Schrader, 22 F.3d 290 (Fed. Cir. 1994) is a 1994 decision of the United States Court of Appeals for the Federal Circuit in which the court summarized and synthesized its precedents under the Freeman-Walter-Abele Test of patent eligibility. Under this test a key element is that the claimed invention  is implemented with some type of hardware—that is, a particular machine. This was one of the last Federal Circuit decisions using that test.

Background

Schrader's invention

Schrader invented a business method for determining which combination of bids in an auction of a set of items reflects the highest total payment to the seller. The Federal Circuit opinion gave an oversimplified example to illustrate the claimed invention:

For example, in an auction involving two contiguous tracts of land, tracts 1 and 2, the following bids might be received and recorded: Bid 1—$100,000 for tract 1 by bidder A; Bid 2—$200,000 for tract 2 by bidder B; and Bid 3—$250,000 for both tracts 1 and 2 by bidder C. The combination of bids that maximizes the revenue to the seller . . . would be bids 1 and 2.

This example does not, however, illustrate the value of the invention, because it does not reveal the difficulty of the underlying problem as the number of items to be bid upon increases. As one commentator pointed out:

Schrader devised a method of making it possible to carry on auction bidding of this type in real time. In other words, Schrader made it possible to carry on a multi–item auction the same way that one carries on an ordinary single-item auction.

As explained in the specification of the patent application, it is contemplated that the auction will be carried out with bidders grouped in different locations, possibly different cities. The bidders would view a large TV display unit on which bids would be displayed. The bids would be processed in a central computer ("processor"), so that the displays could show what combinations of bids for single items or combinations of items were prevailing ("winning") at any given point. That would give each bidder the opportunity to submit a higher bid for a particular item or combination of items, so as to become prevailing bidder in place of the previously prevailing bidder.

Thus, multiple bidders in two or more cities enter bids by means of bid entry devices. These may be keyboards, touch-screens, or other conventional input devices. The bids (i.e., bid signals) are then transmitted to the processor via telecommunications links (for example, telephone lines). The processor processes the bids to determine which combinations prevail at a given time.

The patent application did not describe details of Schrader's actual computer program. But according to a description of discussions with his counsel, it appears that a simple brute force method was used. After the processor evaluates each new bid, the processor sends image signals to display units, so that the displays show the then-prevailing bids. Preferably, this information is presented on the screens in a manner that facilitates bidders' comprehension of what kind of bid raises are needed to exceed the previously prevailing bids. For example, the user interface program highlights the prevailing combination bids in colors contrasting with the others. This system gives the different bidders the opportunity to submit higher bids for particular plots and sets of plots, so as to become prevailing bidders instead of those bidders previously prevailing.

The invention as claimed

The court said claim 1 was representative:

The claim does not mention the bid entry devices, bid signals, telecommunication links, image signals. display devices, or the like, described in the preceding section.

The PTO's decision

The PTO decision ruled that the claims could not be patented, on three grounds:

 "The claimed process involves only information exchange and data processing and does not involve a process of transforming or reducing an article to a different state or thing...." 
 The claimed method "involves a mathematical algorithm or mathematical calculation steps, as the method includes a procedure for solving a given type of mathematical problem. . . . [T]he mathematical computations of the summation of the possible bidding combinations is at the heart of the invention." 
 The claimed subject matter is a method of doing business, which cannot be patented, under § 101.

The Federal Circuit's opinion

Schrader appealed to the Federal Circuit. Schrader argued first that there was no algorithm. The court (in a 2-1 opinion authored by Judge Plager) said that it disagreed, because the claimed procedure for optimizing a combination of bids "is within or similar to a class of well-known mathematical optimization procedures commonly applied to business problems, called linear programming." Apparently, the court considered a brute force procedure a form of algorithm.

Schrader argued next that the claim had sufficient structure in it to satisfy the Freeman-Walter-Abele test:

Thus, he argues the method physically regroups raw bids into new groupings and ultimately "completions," physically transforms bid data into completion data or display data, and makes physical changes to a "display." In the specification, Schrader says that the claim envisages an auction environment in which "all of the bidders are assembled in one large room with a display in front of the room" or with the bidders "assembled in several rooms either adjacent or in different cities interconnected by a closed-circuit television system or the like using large screen displays." 

But all of that was the specification, the court replied, not the claim:

The word "display" is nowhere mentioned in the claim. Moreover, there is nothing physical about bids per se. Thus, the grouping or regrouping of bids cannot constitute a physical change, effect, or result. Also, the terms "bid data," "completion data," or "display data" are nowhere mentioned in the claim and there is no basis to read them into the claim. Therefore, we do not find in the claim any kind of data transformation. Finally, the notion of bidders assembled in a single location in front of a display, or in several locations interconnected by closed-circuit television through a large-screen display is not recited in the claim. The only physical effect or result which is required by the claim is the entering of bids in a "record," a step that can be accomplished simply by writing the bids on a piece of paper or a chalkboard. For purposes of § 101, such activity is indistinguishable from the data gathering steps which [are] insufficient to impart patentability to a claim involving the solving of a mathematical algorithm. . . . Schrader's claims are thus not patentable. 

The court found it unnecessary to opine on the third ground (business method) "in view of our disposition of the appeal on the mathematical algorithm ground."

Judge Newman dissented, arguing: "Schrader's claimed process requires the performance of specified steps and procedures, including calculations, to achieve a technologically useful result; it is not a mathematical abstraction."

Commentary on significance of lack of mechanical elements

It was suggested in commentary that the result would have been different if Schrader had included in the claims the physical elements that the court noted were "nowhere mentioned in the claim":

Schrader may suggest that whether a computerized method of doing something that involves crunching numbers without using any dedicated apparatus (rather, just a general-purpose digital computer) is statutory subject matter depends on how one writes the claims. If you make a great deal of noise in the claim about transforming signals representative of whatever "physical" the method concerns, and you also put in some references to the conventional and perhaps obvious kinds of apparatus (perhaps a display, keyboard, some telephone wires) that one always uses with things of this sort, voilá — patentable subject matter. But if you fail to do that, you just have a nonstatutory method or an abstract idea.

As for form vs. substance, form is discernible; it is objective. . . . [W]e can even describe and define it with particularity. Substance, as always, is elusive.

Another commentator criticized the decision in these terms:

A clear rule for determining § 101 eligibility is discernable from the majority decision in Schrader; however, the doctrinal justification for this rule is not compelling. Schrader established two alternative paths to eligibility for computer inventions under § 101: (1) include physical
apparatus for implementing the process in the claim, or (2) establish that the data signals manipulated by the algorithm are representative of physical activity or tangible objects. If the claims do not include such limitations they will be rejected as claiming the algorithm in isolation. The simple, highly predictable nature of this rule, when combined with its questionable utility as a judicially created per se limitation on § 101 eligibility, led one commentator to label it a "bright zig-zag rule." Would Schrader's claims have been found eligible under § 101 if he had included superfluous physical limitations in the claims such as prior art video display units? That is the type of claiming trickery that Judge Nies protested in [In re] Trovato.

Aftermath

In 1999, in AT&T Corp. v.

Subsequently, in In re Bilski, the Federal Circuit essentially restored the machine-or-transformation analysis of Schrader, but on Supreme Court review, in Bilski v. Kappos, the Court held that the analysis of the type used in Schrader was only a "useful clue" and not definitive. Subsequently, in Alice Corp. v. CLS Bank International, the Supreme Court reaffirmed its position that the analysis of the type used in Schrader was only a "useful clue" and not definitive.

References

External links

Software patent case law
United States Court of Appeals for the Federal Circuit cases
United States patent case law
1994 in United States case law